Metaxidius brunnipennis is a species of beetle in the family Carabidae, the only species in the genus Metaxidius.

References

Dryptinae